The Boys Didn't Wear Hair Gel Before (Los muchachos de antes no usaban gomina) is a 1969 Argentine drama film. It is a remake of the 1937 film The Boys Didn't Wear Hair Gel Before, one of the biggest hits of the Golden Age of Argentine Cinema.

Cast

External links
 

1969 films
Argentine drama films
1960s Spanish-language films
1969 drama films
Remakes of Argentine films
1960s Argentine films
Films directed by Enrique Carreras